Alexander Grinager (January 26, 1865–March 8, 1949) was an American artist most noted for his murals and scenic painting.

Background
Alexander Grinager was born in Albert Lea, Minnesota, the son of Mons and Anna Egge Grinager. His parents had immigrated from the district of Hadeland, Norway. His father was from South Grinager in Tingelstad Parish, his mother from Brandbu, both in Gran municipality in Oppland. Grinager  studied in Philadelphia, Pennsylvania, before going abroad in 1887. From 1887 to 1891, Grinager was a pupil at the Royal Academy in Copenhagen, Denmark, where he studied with Carl Bloch. He also studied in Paris at the Académie Julian and while in France was particularly influenced by the works of Manet and Monet.

Career
In 1896, he moved to Westchester County, New York, remaining there for the remainder of his life. He made his living principally as an easel painter, stage designer, and  muralist. In New York he designed and carried out the scenic effects for many productions by Impresario David Belasco. His mural paintings included The Streets of Baghdad which covered one floor of the Grand Central Station. His paintings were frequently exhibited at the Salmagundi Club in New York City between 1908 and 1946.

In 1916, he also painted a mural entitled Panorama of the History of the U.S. Navy for the Panama–Pacific International Exposition in San Francisco. Grinager participated in exhibits of the Minneapolis Art League and the Artists League of Minneapolis between 1887 and 1915. He exhibited at the Minnesota Industrial Exposition in 1891 and in 1893. In 1910, his paintings were exhibited at the Odin Club in Minneapolis, Minnesota, and at the St. Paul Auditorium. In 1932, he painted murals for the Century of Progress Exposition in Chicago, Illinois.

Some of his works are held at the Minneapolis Institute of Art.

References

Other sources
 Conforti,  Michael  Minnesota 1900: art and life on the upper Mississippi, 1890–1915 (University of Delaware Press. 1994)
Gerdts, William H. Art Across America: Two Centuries of Regional Painting, 1710–1920  (New York, NY: Abbeville Press. 1990)
Hansen, Carl G.O.  My Minneapolis (Minneapolis, MN: Standard Press, 1956)
 Haugan, Reidar Rye  Prominent Artists and Exhibits of Their Work in Chicago (Chicago Norske Klub. Nordmanns-Forbundet, 24: 371–374, Volume 7, 1933)
Nelson, Marion Revelations of Light ( Norwegian-American Museum Newsletter. Vol. 24. Summer 1989)

External links

 Boys Bathing  Alexander Grinager, 1894
Self Portrait Alexander Grinager, 1919
Autumn Nordstede Alexander Grinager ca 1928
Haystacks Auvers Sur Oise Alexander Grinager ca 1929
Olive Grove Alexander Grinager 1894

1865 births
1949 deaths
19th-century American painters
American male painters
20th-century American painters
American muralists
American people of Norwegian descent
People from Albert Lea, Minnesota
Painters from Minnesota
Académie Julian alumni
19th-century American male artists
20th-century American male artists